Amber Marshall (born January 24, 1999) is an American professional soccer player who plays as a midfielder.

Club career 
In March 2021, Marshall signed a one-year contract with Houston Dash in the NWSL ahead of the 2021 NWSL Challenge Cup and 2021 season. She made her debut on April 9, 2021, during a 0–0 draw against the Chicago Red Stars in the Challenge Cup.

References

External links 
 
 Utah State Aggies profile
 

Living people
1999 births
Soccer players from Utah
People from Syracuse, Utah
American women's soccer players
Women's association football midfielders
Utah State Aggies women's soccer players
Houston Dash players
National Women's Soccer League players